Jimmy Casper (born 28 May 1978 in Montdidier, Somme) is a French retired road bicycle racer, who competed as a professional between 1998 and 2012. He is best known for winning stage 1 of 2006 Tour de France.

Career
He has on two occasions finished in last place in the General classification of the Tour de France, thereby 'winning' the red lantern.

Casper was suspended from his team, Agritubel because he tested positive for corticosteroid, an asthma drug that is banned unless the user has a medical exemption for its use, during the 2008 Tour de France by the Agence Française de Lutte contre le Dopage. The exemption had been renewed but with a previous asthma medication than the one prescribed and used during the Tour de France. He has been cleared of any charges during the hearing held by the Fédération Française de Cyclisme. For 2009 he signed with the  team, with whom he enjoyed success, winning two stages at the Étoile de Bessèges, a stage of the Critérium International, the Paris–Camembert, and the Grand Prix de Denain. Casper joined the  team for the 2012 season.

In December 2012, Casper announced his retirement as a professional cyclist. He had a total of 61 victories and stated that he would like to remain in the cycling environment with a coaching job.

Career achievements

Major results

1996 
 7th Road race, UCI Junior Road World Championships
1999
 Deutschland Tour
1st Stages 1, 3, 4 & 8
 1st Stage 1a Tour de l'Ain
 1st Stage 4a Four Days of Dunkirk
 9th Ronde van Midden-Zeeland
2000
 8th Overall Tour de Normandie
2001
 1st Stage 3 Tour Méditerranéen
 1st Stage 2a Route du Sud
 1st Stage 2b Circuit des Mines
 1st Stage 3 Tour du Poitou-Charentes
 6th Overall Étoile de Bessèges
2002
 1st Cholet-Pays de Loire
 1st Kampioenschap van Vlaanderen
 1st Stage 2 GP Erik Breukink
 1st Stage 7 Circuit des Mines
 1st Stage 9 Tour de l'Avenir
 6th Road race, UCI Road World Championships
 8th Classic Haribo
2003
 1st Stage 3a Giro della Liguria
 2nd Overall Driedaagse Van West-Vlaanderen
1st Stage 1
 3rd GP de Villers-Cotterêts
 6th Kuurne–Brussels–Kuurne
 8th Overall GP Erik Breukink
1st Stage 1
 8th Grote Prijs Jef Scherens
2004
 1st  Overall Circuit Franco-Belge
1st Stage 2
 1st Kampioenschap van Vlaanderen
 1st Stage 1 Four Days of Dunkirk
 1st Stage 6 Danmark Rundt
 2nd Overall Tour de Picardie
1st Stage 3b
 5th Gent–Wevelgem
 6th Nokere Koerse
 7th Classic Haribo
2005
 1st Châteauroux Classic
 1st Grand Prix de Denain
 1st Stage 5 Étoile de Bessèges
 2nd Overall Circuit Franco-Belge
2006
 1st  Overall Tour de Picardie
1st Stage 3
 1st Grand Prix de Denain
 Tour de France
1st Stage 1
Held  after Stage 1
 2nd Tour de Vendée
2007
 1st  Overall Driedaagse van West-Vlaanderen
1st Stage 1
 1st Memorial Samyn
2008
 1st Stage 2 Tour Méditerranéen
 1st Stage 2 Circuit de Lorraine
 2nd Classic Loire Atlantique
 2nd Grand Prix de Denain
 3rd GP de la Ville de Rennes
 7th GP Cholet
 8th Overall Boucles de la Mayenne
1st Stage 2
 9th Tour de Picardie
 10th Route Adélie de Vitré
2009
 1st Overall French Road Cycling Cup
 1st Paris–Camembert
 1st Grand Prix de Denain
 1st Châteauroux Classic
 Étoile de Bessèges
1st Stages 1 & 2
 1st Stage 1 Critérium International
 1st Stage 2 Tour de Gironde
 1st Stage 1 Ronde de l'Oise
 1st Stage 1 Tour du Poitou Charentes et de la Vienne
 2nd GP Cholet
 3rd Overall Tour de Picardie
 4th Grand Prix de Fourmies
 6th Overall Boucles de la Mayenne
1st Stage 1
 10th Le Samyn
 10th Tro-Bro Léon
2010
 1st Val d'Ille U Classic 35
 1st Stage 1 Tour of Oman
 1st Stage 4 Tour de Normandie
 1st Stage 3 Tour of Belgium
 1st Stage 3 Volta a Portugal
 6th Overall Tour du Poitou Charentes et de la Vienne
1st Stage 5
 8th Scheldeprijs
 8th Grand Prix de Denain
 9th GP Cholet
 10th Overall Tour de Picardie
1st Stage 3
 10th Châteauroux Classic
 10th Grand Prix de la Somme
2011
 1st  Overall Boucles de la Mayenne
1st Stages 2 & 3
 1st Grand Prix de Denain
 1st Stage 3 Tour de Picardie
 1st Stage 1 Tour de l'Ain
 7th Le Samyn
 9th Paris–Troyes
2012
 4th Flèche d'Emeraude
 6th Road race, National Road Championships
 6th Grand Prix d'Isbergues
 10th Grand Prix de Denain

Grand Tour general classification results timeline

References

1978 births
Living people
People from Montdidier, Somme
French male cyclists
Doping cases in cycling
French Tour de France stage winners
French sportspeople in doping cases
Sportspeople from Somme (department)
Cyclists from Hauts-de-France